Michelle Battaglia (?? ?? ?? Italy  —  ?? ?? ?? São Paulo), known as Miguel Battaglia, was an Italian-Brazilian tailor and football chairman, being the founder and first president of the Brazilian football club Corinthians.

External links
 Corinthians official website

Brazilian football chairmen and investors
Italian emigrants to Brazil